Elmira Korjunovna Antonyan is an Armenian former international table tennis player who represented the Soviet Union. Her sister Narine Antonyan was also a table tennis player.

Table tennis career
She won two World Championship medals at the 1975 World Table Tennis Championships; a bronze medal in the women's doubles with Tatiana Ferdman and a silver medal in the mixed doubles with Sarkis Sarchayan.

Coaching 
She was a coach in Soviet Union, Armenia, Italy and Switzerland.

See also
 List of table tennis players
 List of World Table Tennis Championships medalists

References

Soviet table tennis players
Living people
1955 births
Sportspeople from Yerevan
World Table Tennis Championships medalists
Soviet Armenians
Armenian table tennis players